PhotoLine is a graphics editor for Windows and Mac OS X. Its features include 16 bits of color depth, full color management, support of RGB, CMYK and Lab color models, layer support, and non-destructive image manipulation. It can also be used for desktop publishing.

Features 

 raster graphics editing, vector graphics editing and basic desktop publishing
 full color management, and, Monitor proofing
 RGB, CMYK, Lab and grayscalecolor models; color models and ICC profiles can be chosen on a layer by layer basis
 8, 16 and 32 bits of color depth per channel
 full layer support, including blending modes and grouping
 non-destructive editing
 filters, brushes and adjustment layers can be used in Lab and HIS color modes (HIS is a variant of HSL), independently of the color model of the underlying image layer
 vector layers and text layers including spell checking and character and paragraph styles and text flow inside or around objects.
 multi page documents, including text flow between pages
 supports Photoshop plugins and PSP tubes
 support for pressure-sensitive graphics tablets
 support for Photoshop PSD files, PDF files, animated GIFs, Adobe Flash animations, and, SVGs
 camera raw image format support based upon dcraw
 macro (action) recording.

Language support
PhotoLine is available in the following languages:
English, German, French, Italian and Chinese.

File format 
Native PhotoLine files have the file extension .PLD or  .pld which is an abbreviation of "PhotoLine Document". It may contain embedded JPEG, PNG or camera raw images.  In addition it includes a preview image in JPEG or PNG format which can be used by the OS or third-party programs for displaying a thumbnail of the image. On Mac OS X thumbnails are supported natively, for Windows the FastPictureViewer Standalone Codec Pack provides the ability to display thumbnails inside the Windows Explorer.

Version history 

Originally, PhotoLine was developed for the Atari ST computer. Version 2 was the first version for Windows, and since Version 6, PhotoLine is also available for Mac OS.

See also 

 Comparison of raster graphics editors
 Comparison of vector graphics editors

References

External links 
 
 PhotoLine Forum

Graphics software
Raster graphics editors
Vector graphics editors
Windows graphics-related software
MacOS graphics-related software